Billy Grimes (July 27, 1927 – March 25, 2005) was a professional American football player who played running back for three seasons in the National Football League (NFL).

Career
Grimes played college football at Oklahoma State University. He was selected in the second round of the 1949 NFL Draft by the Chicago Bears, but instead played for the Los Angeles Dons of the All-America Football Conference. The following year he entered the NFL when he was selected by the Green Bay Packers in the 1950 AAFC dispersal draft. Grimes played for the Packers three years and went to the Pro Bowl after the 1950 and 1951 seasons.

References

External links
 scout.com Packer report of Grimes death
 

1927 births
2005 deaths
People from Carter County, Oklahoma
People from Stephens County, Oklahoma
Sportspeople from Oklahoma City
American football running backs
Oklahoma State Cowboys football players
Los Angeles Dons players
Green Bay Packers players
Western Conference Pro Bowl players